Road Wild (originally known as Hog Wild) was a professional wrestling pay-per-view (PPV) event produced by World Championship Wrestling (WCW) that was held in the month of August from 1996 to 1999. It was a free event held in Sturgis, South Dakota during the annual Sturgis Motorcycle Rally. After the first event, WCW changed the name to Road Wild because of a potential trademark issue with the Harley-Davidson club Harley Owners Group (HOG). In 2000, it was replaced by New Blood Rising. Hulk Hogan appeared in the main event of all four editions of the event.

WrestleCrap writer Art O'Donnell criticised the event as a "financial blunder" and said that WCW held "a yearly pay-per-view at a biker rally with zero live gate just because Eric Bischoff loves motorcycles".

Since 2001, WWE (through its subsidiary WCW, Inc.) owns the rights to the event. In 2015, all WCW pay-per-views were made available on the WWE Network.

Road Wild dates and venues

References

 
Recurring events established in 1996
Recurring events disestablished in 1999
Professional wrestling in Sturgis, South Dakota